The Redmond Town Hall, at 18 W. Main St. in Redmond, Utah, was built in 1881.  It was listed on the National Register of Historic Places in 1976.

The adobe building, once a meeting hall, was later used as a jail. The addition served first as a town hall.

It was deemed notable as "one of the best remaining examples in Utah of a building which served as a community center for religious, educational and political purposes. The original adobe structure with the larger rock addition also stands as an excellent example of the evolution of community buildings in rural pioneer Utah."

In 1976 the building was being renovated.

References

City and town halls on the National Register of Historic Places in Utah
Jails in Utah
National Register of Historic Places in Sevier County, Utah
Buildings and structures completed in 1881
Jails on the National Register of Historic Places in Utah